Anancus is an extinct genus of elephantoid proboscideans ("gomphothere" sensu lato) native to Afro-Eurasia, that lived from the Tortonian stage of the late Miocene until its extinction during the Early Pleistocene, roughly from 8.5–2 million years ago.

Taxonomy 
 
The type genus of the family, Anancus, was named by Auguste Aymard in 1855. It was traditionally allocated to Gomphotheriidae, but was later assigned to the family Elephantidae by McKenna and Bell (1997), Lambert and Shoshani (1998), Kalb and Froelich (1995), and Shoshani and Tassy (2005). Hautier et al. (2009) assigned the genus to the subfamily Anancinae within Gomphotheriidae. Recently Anancus along with other tetralophodont gomphotheres have been removed from Gomphotheridae, and are now regarded as members of Elephantoidea instead.

Description

The skull is proportionally tall and short, with an elevated dome and an enlarged tympanic bulla. The molars were typically tetralophodont (bearing four crests or ridges) but were pentalophodont in some species. The premolars were absent in several species. On the upper molars, the posterior pretrite central conules were reduced, as were the anterior pretrite central conules on the lower molars. The pretrite and posttrite half-loph(id)s were dislocated from each other, resulting in the successive loph(id)s exhibiting an alternating pattern.

Evolution 
The oldest known species of Anancus is A. perimensis, with fossils known from the Tortonian ~ 8.5 million years ago Siwalik Hills of Pakistan. Anancus entered Europe approximately 7.2 million years ago and around 7 million years ago dispersed into Africa. Anancus first appeared in China around 6 million years ago (A. sinensis). Anancus disappeared from Asia and Africa around the end of the Pliocene, approximately 2.6 million years ago. The European A. arvernensis was the last surviving species, becoming extinct during the Early Pleistocene, around 2 million years ago.

Diet 
Dental microwear analysis of Anancus arvernensis generally suggests that it was a browser, consuming twigs, bark, seeds and fruit.  Stable carbon isotopes from Ethiopian Anancus tooth enamel dating to 3–4 million years ago suggest that it grazed on C4 plants.

Gallery

References

Elephantoidea
Prehistoric placental genera
Miocene proboscideans
Pliocene proboscideans
Pleistocene proboscideans
Miocene genus first appearances
Pleistocene genus extinctions
Miocene mammals of Africa
Pliocene mammals of Africa
Pleistocene mammals of Africa
Miocene mammals of Asia
Pleistocene mammals of Asia
Pliocene mammals of Asia
Miocene mammals of Europe
Pliocene mammals of Europe
Pleistocene mammals of Europe
Fossil taxa described in 1855